Kopperston (also Kopperstone) is a census-designated place (CDP) in Wyoming County, West Virginia, United States.  Its elevation is 1,660 feet (506 m).  Kopperston once had a post office, which closed on March 10, 2007. As of the 2010 census, its population was 616.

Climate
The climate in this area is characterized by hot, humid summers and generally mild to cool winters.  According to the Köppen Climate Classification system, Kopperston has a humid subtropical climate, abbreviated "Cfa" on climate maps.

References

External links
 Coalfields of the Appalachian Mountains - Kopperston, WV

Census-designated places in Wyoming County, West Virginia
Coal towns in West Virginia